Beatles '65 is an album by the English rock band the Beatles that was issued in the United States and Canada in December 1964. Released as the North American alternative to Beatles for Sale, it was the band's fifth studio album culled by Capitol Records in the US from the Beatles' EMI releases. The LP was also issued in West Germany on the Odeon label.

In 2004, Beatles '65 was released on CD for the first time as part of the Capitol Albums, Volume 1 box set. In 2014, the album was reissued on CD, both individually and as part of the box set The US Albums, using the UK mixes as remastered in 2009.

Music
Beatles '65 includes eight of the fourteen songs from Beatles for Sale. It also includes "I'll Be Back", which was cut from the US version of the Hard Day's Night album, and both sides of the single "I Feel Fine" / "She's a Woman". The latter two songs were issued in "duophonic" stereo and included added reverb by Capitol Records' executive Dave Dexter, Jr. to cover up the use of the mono mixes sent from the UK.

Two of the three songs written by Carl Perkins and recorded by the Beatles appear on this album. The six Beatles for Sale tracks omitted from the album were issued by Capitol on Beatles VI in June 1965.

Reception
In the United States, Beatles '65 jumped from number 98 straight to number 1, making the biggest jump to the top position in the history of the Billboard album charts up to that time. It remained at number 1 for nine straight weeks from 9 January 1965. The album was the top selling non-soundtrack LP based on Billboards year-end chart for 1965. By 31 December 1964, the album had sold 1,967,261 copies in the US; by the end of the 1960s, sales there were up to 2,327,186.

Writing in The Rolling Stone Record Guide (1983), John Swenson described Beatles '65 as the first of the band's "classic 'concept' albums". He said that the LP "worked as a musical whole" rather than merely serving as a collection of "the latest bunch of songs that could be assembled into a record in any order". Several albums were released and promoted in America during 1965 sporting a similar title to Beatles '65. These included Sinatra '65 by Frank Sinatra and Ellington '65 by Duke Ellington on Reprise Records, and Brasil '65 by Sérgio Mendes on the Beatles' own Capitol label.

Track listing

All tracks written by John Lennon and Paul McCartney, except where noted.

Personnel
The Beatles
 John Lennon – rhythm guitar, harmonica (on "I'm a Loser"), vocals, lead guitar (on "I Feel Fine"), tambourine (on "Everybody's Trying to Be My Baby")
 Paul McCartney – bass guitar, vocals, piano (on "She's a Woman"), Hammond organ (on "Mr. Moonlight")
 George Harrison – lead guitar, backing vocals, lead vocals (on "Everybody's Trying to Be My Baby"), African drum (on "Mr. Moonlight")
 Ringo Starr – drums, percussion, lead vocals (on "Honey Don't")

Production
 George Martin – producer, piano (on "No Reply" and "Rock and Roll Music")

Charts

Certifications

References

Sources

External links

1964 albums
Albums produced by George Martin
The Beatles albums
Capitol Records albums